Title V of the New Hampshire Revised Statutes Annotated is the state of New Hampshire's laws regarding taxation of its citizens on a state level. The laws cannot be more lax than Federal code, and is presumed as de facto at the local level unless more specific, non-conflicting laws are in place.

Chapter 71:The Tax Commission
The New Hampshire Tax Commission was the former tax gathering body of the state, as under RSA 71, but this was repealed and split into RSA 71A: The Board Of Revenue Administration, which was also later repealed/dissolved, and RSA 71B: The Board of Tax and Land Appeals

New Hampshire statutes